Lucas Arnold Ker and Mariano Hood were the defending champions, but Arnold Ker did not compete this year. Hood teamed up with Martín García and lost in the quarterfinals to Juan Ignacio Chela and Luis Horna.

José Acasuso and Sebastián Prieto won the title by defeating Victor Hănescu and Andrei Pavel 6–3, 4–6, 6–3 in the final.

Seeds

Draw

Draw

References

External links
 Official results archive (ATP)
 Official results archive (ITF)

Tennis tournaments in Romania
2005 in tennis
Romanian Open